Highway 924 is a provincial highway in the north-west region of the Canadian province of Saskatchewan. It runs from Highway 55 near Cowan Dam Recreation Site at the source of the Cowan River to the community of Dore Lake on Doré Lake. Highway 924 connects with Highway 916.

Highway 924 was originally designated as Highway 124, but was renumbered in the early 1980s as part of the establishment of the 900-series highways.

Communities and recreation 
Highway 924 provides access to the communities of Dore Lake, Sled Lake and Michel Point, as well as the provincial recreation sites of Shirley Lake and Beaupré Creek. Lakes accessed from the highway include Doré Lake, Beaupré Lake, Shirley Lake, Sled Lake, and Cowan Lake.

Shirley Lake Recreation Site is accessed from a short road off of Highway 924. It is a small park with a boat launch on the southern shore of Shirley Lake. Shirley Lake is a small but deep lake.

See also 
Roads in Saskatchewan
Transportation in Saskatchewan

References 

924